Markley may refer to:

People:
Alfred C. Markley (1843–1926), American Brigadier General
Benjamin Markley Boyer (1823–1887), Democratic member of the U.S. House of Representatives from Pennsylvania
Bob Markley (1935–2003), American singer-songwriter and record producer who co-founded The West Coast Pop Art Experimental Band
Linn Markley Farish (1901–1944), American rugby union player and spy
Philip Swenk Markley (1789–1834), member of the U.S. House of Representatives from Pennsylvania
Stephen Markley, American journalist and author 
Helen Markley Miller (1896–1984), American writer of historical and biographical fiction for children

Places:
Markley, Texas, unincorporated community in Young County, Texas, United States
Markley Lake or Scott County, Minnesota, county located in the U.S. state of Minnesota
Mary Markley Hall (Markley) is a residence hall operated by the University of Michigan University Housing in Ann Arbor

Music:
Old Man Markley, punk & bluegrass band based out of Los Angeles, CA
Dean Markley USA, company that manufactures musical instrument related products, primarily guitar strings
Markley A Group, a band

Businesses:
Markley, LLC, business based in Boston, MA primarily known for data center, real estate and technology services

See also
Arkley
Markey (disambiguation)
Markle (disambiguation)
Marly (disambiguation)